Christopher Mitchell is a British historian and is Professor Emeritus at the School for Conflict Analysis and Resolution at George Mason University

Publications

References

External links
 Biography

Living people
British anthropologists
George Mason University faculty
1934 births